Robert Lücken (born 30 April 1985) is a Dutch rower. He won with the Dutch team a gold medal in the M4- at the 2013 World Rowing Championships and became Amsterdam Sportsman of the year in 2013. At  the 2016 Summer Olympics in Rio de Janeiro he was part of the Men's eight team that won a bronze medal.

References

External links

1985 births
Living people
Dutch male rowers
Rowers from Amsterdam
Olympic rowers of the Netherlands
World Rowing Championships medalists for the Netherlands
Rowers at the 2016 Summer Olympics
Olympic bronze medalists for the Netherlands
Olympic medalists in rowing
Medalists at the 2016 Summer Olympics
Rowers at the 2020 Summer Olympics
20th-century Dutch people
21st-century Dutch people